Charles Edge may refer to:

 Charles Edge (basketball) (born 1950), American basketball player
 Charles Edge (architect) (1800–1867), British architect
 Charles Edge (computer scientist), American computer scientist